Parents of the Band is a 2008 British comedy television series, created by Jimmy Nail and Tarquin Gotch and shown on BBC One. The show stars Jimmy Nail, and is set around a teenage musical band, which each band member's parents are trying to manage.

Plot 
Phil Parker (Nail) is the father of Jack (Peter Losasso), who is a drummer in a teen band with a number of his friends. Phil is recently separated from his wife Marketa (Young) and was in a 'one-hit wonder' band in the 1980s, with the song "I Cry". Jack and his band simply want to jam and have fun, but their parents are standing in the way, not because they disapprove, but because they also want to be a part of the rock-star lifestyle. Ultimately the band enter into a talent contest.

Development 
The six episode series was commissioned by Lucy Lumsden, BBC Controller, Comedy Commissioning. The show was a co-venture between BBC Vision Productions and Serious Entertainment Productions. The latter company is owned by the series co-creators, Jimmy Nail and Tarquin Gotch. The series was written by David Cummings, and the script was edited by the writing partners, Dick Clement and Ian La Frenais. The producer is Charlie Hanson and executive producer is Kenton Allen, BBC Creative Head of Comedy Talent and Comedy North.

Jimmy Nail composed the theme music with Gary Kemp, of the eighties synth-pop band Spandau Ballet. A music video for the song "I Cry" was also posted on the show's BBC website.

Cast 
 Jimmy Nail as Phil Parker
 Peter Losasso as Jack Parker
 Nina Young as Marketa
 Cascade Brown as Shania
 Niky Wardley as Sandy Soutakis
 David Barseghian as Eddie Soutakis
 Lucinda Dryzek as Lucy Soutakis
 Nicola Hughes as Carmen Cunningham
 Colin McFarlane as Ashton Cunningham
 Franz Drameh as Granville Cunningham
 Michael Karim as Adi Kundra
 Geoffrey McGivern as Kipper Hitchcock

Broadcast 
The first episode aired on 28 November 2008 at 8:30pm on BBC One. On BBC One Scotland, and BBC One Northern Ireland however, the show aired at various times on Fridays. Each episode of Parents of the Band also aired in High-definition on BBC HD a week after its BBC One showing. The first episode received 2.61 million (11.2%) viewers. Episode 2 gained an additional 250,000 viewers, with 2.86m (12.7%). The final episode of series one aired on 9 January 2009.

Episodes

References

External links 

2000s British sitcoms
2008 British television series debuts
2009 British television series endings
BBC television sitcoms